The Col du Grapillon (or col de Grapillon) is a mountain pass located  above sea level in the Chartreuse Mountains between La Cochette to the south, and Mont Outheran to the north

Access 
The pass is available only to hikers. It connects Le Désert d'Entremont (Entremont-le-Vieux district) to Saint-Thibaud-de-Couz, and it's the southern access path of the Mont Outheran and northern access path of La Cochette.

Environmental protection 
The Col du Grapillon is part of the natural area of ecological, faunistic and floristic interest of Mont Outheran.

References 

Mountain passes of Auvergne-Rhône-Alpes
Mountain passes of the Alps